Todd E. Rasmussen, MD, FACS is a Professor and Vice Chair for Education in the Department of Surgery at Mayo Clinic, Rochester and a Senior Associate Consultant in the Division of Vascular and Endovascular Surgery. Prior to joining the Mayo Clinic, he had a 28-year career in the military, retiring as an Air Force Colonel in 2021. His most recent military assignment was as Associate Dean or Research at the Uniformed Services University of the Health Sciences and an attending surgeon at the Walter Reed National Military Medical Center.  A native of Kansas, Rasmussen completed his undergraduate degree at the University of Kansas and his medical degree at Mayo Medical School (1993), followed by surgical training at Wilford Hall Medical Center at Lackland Air Force Base and vascular surgery specialty training  at Mayo Clinic.

Rasmussen had been assigned to Andrews Air Force Base just before September 11, 2001 and soon after began caring for the injured returning from Afghanistan at Walter Reed Army Medical Center. He began a series of deployments to the Air Force Theater Hospital on Balad Air Base as well as Bagram Air Base and the Afghan National Army Hospital in Kabul, Afghanistan. During this time in the Air Force, he initiated a research and innovation program aimed at developing a better understanding of vascular injury, hemorrhage control and shock as well as new approaches to managing these conditions.

Rasmussen has led training missions in Morocco, Pakistan, and Russia, and his research efforts have resulted in hundreds of publications, including two textbooks, the Handbook of Patient Care in Vascular Disease and the 3rd edition of Rich's Vascular Trauma. He co-authored Vascular Injury Rates in the Wars in Iraq and Afghanistan in which he wrote that the frequency of vascular injury on the battlefield has increased by a factor of 5 between Vietnam and the current wars.  Rasmussen was also one of the investigators in the Military Application of Tranexamic Acid in Trauma Resuscitation Study (MATTERS) which was a collaboration with British researchers on the use of a drug called tranexamic acid (TXA) in patients with severe bleeding. The study indicated that patients treated with TXA survived twice as often as those who did not receive the drug.

Rasmussen is a co-inventor of REBOA (resuscitative endovascular balloon occlusion of the aorta), which is a minimally invasive approach used to sustain blood pressure and control bleeding in severely injured and shocked patients. The ER-REBOA catheter of which he is a co-inventor has been used thousands of times in the U.S. and around the world and was featured in a 2017 New York Times article by Denise Grady.

In 2019, Rasmussen led a team of military surgeons at Walter Reed National Military Medical Center as the first in the Military Health System (MHS) to implant the  Human Acellular Vessel, or HAV, into a patient who was in danger of losing his leg from vascular disease. Dr. Rasmussen had previously worked in support of the research and development of this bioengineered blood vessel which has significant potential to be used in the management of wartime vascular injury.

Rasmussen was a 2019-2020 Association for American Medical Colleges (AAMC) Council of Deans fellow, and in February 2020 he delivered the Peter Safar lecture at the Society of Critical Care Medicine in Orlando, Florida. In 2021,  Rasmussen was selected to serve on the board of the National Museum of Civil War Medicine.  Following his retirement from the Air Force he joined the Division of Vascular and Endovascular Surgery at the Mayo Clinic in Rochester, Minnesota.

In 2012, Rasmussen gave a TEDx talk on the transformation of military trauma care and its impact on medicine. He served as Deputy Commander of the Institute of Surgical Research from 2010 to 2013 and then moved to direct the larger DoD Combat Casualty Care Research Program at Fort Detrick, Maryland. His awards include the Gold Headed Cane for distinction in clinical and academic practice, the Baron Dominique Jean Larrey for Excellence in Military Surgery, and in 2015, he was recognized as a Hero in Medicine by the Center for Public-Private Partnerships.

Rasmussen has contributed to articles published in USA TODAY, the Health Affairs blog and the New England Journal of Medicine. His June 2018 commentary entitled “Actionable Information to Reduce the Burden of Non-battle Injury in Deployed US Service Members” was quoted by several news outlets including CNN.

References

Living people
American vascular surgeons
Year of birth missing (living people)
Physicians of the Mayo Clinic
Uniformed Services University of the Health Sciences faculty
United States Air Force Medical Corps officers
Fellows of the American College of Surgeons
University of Kansas alumni